The Crab Orchard Mountains Group is a geologic group in Georgia, United States. It preserves fossils dating back to the Carboniferous period.

See also

 List of fossiliferous stratigraphic units in Georgia (U.S. state)
 Paleontology in Georgia (U.S. state)

References
 

Geologic groups of Georgia (U.S. state)